Henri Beaufour is a French businessman and billionaire. He is the descendant of Henri Beaufour, founder of the Beaufour laboratories, ancestor of the French biopharmaceutical company Ipsen.

Biography 
Born on January 6, 1965, in Neuilly-sur-Seine, Henri Beaufour is the son of Albert Beaufour, who died in 2000, and the grandson of Dr. Henri Beaufour, founder of the Ipsen group. 

He holds a bachelor's of arts from Georgetown University (Washington, D.C.). 

When Albert Beaufour died in 2000, the 76% of the capital held by the family was divided between the three brothers and sisters. One of the daughters, Véronique Beaufour, sold her share, representing 6% of the capital. Anne and her brother Henri Beaufour thus control 57% of the Ipsen group, and both sit on the Board of Directors of Ipsen and Mayroy, the Ipsen controlling holding company. Their share in Ipsen is still 52% in 2020.   

In 2018, his fortune is estimated at 3 billion euros.

References

1965 births
French billionaires
Living people
Georgetown University alumni
French expatriates in England